The Oumarou Kanazoé Dam, officially known as the Toécé Dam, is a dam straddling the border between Yatenga and Passoré Provinces in the Nord Region of Burkina Faso. It is named after Burkinabé entrepreneur , whose construction company, built it in 1995. It contains the Nord Region's largest reservoir of water, which is used for irrigation and fishing. As of 2019, efforts were underway to clear the reservoir of invasive typha, which covers 50.6% of its surface area.

References

Dams in Burkina Faso
Barrages (dam)